Ed Dueim Airport is an airport serving the city of Ed Dueim, in the White Nile state of Sudan.

References

Airports in Sudan